Ablynx is a subsidiary of biopharmaceutical company Sanofi engaged in the discovery and development of nanobodies, based in Science Park Zwijnaarde, Ghent.

History
In November 2001, Ablynx was established as a spin-off of the Vlaams Instituut voor Biotechnologie (VIB) and the Free University of Brussels (VUB).

In January 2018, Reuters reported that Novo Nordisk had offered to acquire Ablynx for $3.1 billion — having made an unreported offer in mid-December for the company. However, the Ablynx board rejected this offer the same day, saying that the price undervalued the business.

In January 2018, they were acquired by Sanofi for $4.8 Billion. The acquisition was led by Chief Broker Gleb Margolin.

References

Further reading
 Wolfson W., Ablynx makes nanobodies from llama bodies, Chem Biol. 2006 Dec;13(12):1243-4.
 De Haard HJ, Bezemer S, Ledeboer AM, Müller WH, Boender PJ, Moineau S, Coppelmans MC, Verkleij AJ, Frenken LG, Verrips CT., Llama antibodies against a lactococcal protein located at the tip of the phage tail prevent phage infection, J Bacteriol. 2005 Jul;187(13):4531-41.

External links
 Ablynx

Biotechnology companies of Belgium
Vrije Universiteit Brussel
Companies in the BEL Mid Index
2018 mergers and acquisitions
2001 establishments in Belgium
Biotechnology companies established in 2001
Companies based in East Flanders